The 1979 Individual Speedway World Championship was the 34th edition of the official World Championship to determine the world champion rider.

In his 14th straight World Final appearance (dating back to 1966), New Zealand's Ivan Mauger won his 6th Speedway World Championship, breaking the previous record of 5 wins held by himself and legendary Swede Ove Fundin. Mauger scored 14 points to defeat local favourite Zenon Plech (13) and young English tearaway Michael Lee (11), with Lee the only rider to defeat Mauger on the day. Lee also had to defeat Kelly Moran (USA), Billy Sanders (Australia) and defending champion Ole Olsen in a runoff for third after all four riders finished on 11 points. This would prove to be the last appearance for Ivan Mauger as a rider in a World Final.

British Qualification

Similar to the previous season, the Sunday Mirror sponsored British qualifying rounds for the World Championship doubled up as qualifying rounds for the Berger-sponsored Grand Prix. Therefore, many non-British riders such as Scott Autrey and Ivan Mauger rode in these meetings scoring points towards the Grand Prix qualification - but their scores didn't count towards World Championship qualification.

Rye House track flooded so event moved to Hackney

British Final
June 20, 1979
 Coventry, Brandon Stadium
First 10 to Commonwealth Final plus 1 reserve

Swedish Qualification

Swedish Final
May 29, 1979
 Kumla
First 5 to Nordic Final + 1 reserve

New Zealand Final
 21 January 1979
  Christchurch
 First 8 to Austral-Asian Final

Intercontinental Round

American Final
December 29, 1978
 Santa Ana, Santa Ana Speedway
First 2 to Intercontinental final plus 1 reserve

Australian Final
 February 11, 1978
  Mildura
 First 8 to Austral-Asian Final

Australasian Final
February 23, 1979
 Adelaide, Rowley Park Speedway
Referee:  Sam Bass
First 6 to Commonwealth final plus 1 reserve

Danish Final
 May 6, 1979
  Fjelsted
 First 5 to Nordic Final

Nordic Final
June 5, 1979
 Norrköping
First 5 to Intercontinental final plus 1 reserve

Commonwealth Final
July 1, 1979
 London, White City Stadium
First 9 to Intercontinental final plus 1 reserve

Intercontinental Final
August 8, 1979
 London, White City Stadium
First 9 to World Final plus 1 reserve

Continental Round

Continental Final
July 8, 1979
 Pocking 
First 4 to World final plus 1 reserve
Polish riders Zenon Plech, Edward Jancarz and Robert Słaboń seeded to World Final

World Final
September 2, 1979
 Chorzów, Silesian Stadium

References

1979
World Individual
World
Speedway competitions in Poland